Declan Moore (born 15 September 1996) is a New Zealand-born, Australian rugby union player who plays for Irish United Rugby Championship club Ulster. He plays as a hooker.

Born in New Zealand, Moore moved to Australia at a young age. He has played most of his senior rugby for Sydney University in the Shute Shield, also representing Sydney during the 2019 National Rugby Championship. Super Rugby club Melbourne Rebels selected Moore in their squad for the 2020 Super Rugby season and the 2020 Super Rugby AU season, but he made no appearances for the club during these competitions. Moore was also selected for the Australian under-20s squad, though injury denied him any caps.

Moore joined Irish United Rugby Championship and Champions Cup club Munster on a deal for the 2021–22 season in September 2021. Moore's paternal grandfather is from Carrickfergus, County Antrim, and he has maternal relatives from Castlerea, County Roscommon, meaning Moore is Irish-qualified and therefore eligible to represent Ireland's national team. He made his senior competitive debut for the province in their opening 2021–22 Champions Cup fixture away to English club Wasps on 12 December 2021, coming on as a replacement for Scott Buckley in the province's 35–14 win.

Moore joined Munster's provincial rivals Ulster to provide injury cover in late December 2021 and on loan in February 2022, and he will join Ulster permanently from the 2022–23 season. He made his debut for Ulster in their rescheduled 2021–22 United Rugby Championship round 8 fixture at home to provincial rivals Connacht on 4 February 2022, scoring a try in their 32–12 win.

References

External links
Ulster Profile
Munster Profile
Melbourne Rebels Profile
Profile @ itsrugby.co.uk

URC Profile

Living people
1996 births
New Zealand emigrants to Australia
Australian rugby union players
Sydney (NRC team) players
Sydney Stars players
Melbourne Rebels players
Munster Rugby players
Ulster Rugby players
Rugby union hookers
Australian expatriate rugby union players
Australian expatriate sportspeople in Ireland
Expatriate rugby union players in Ireland
Australian expatriate sportspeople in Northern Ireland
Expatriate rugby union players in Northern Ireland
Australian people of Irish descent